The Gulngai were an indigenous Australian rainforest people of the state of Queensland. They are not to be confused with the Kuringgai.

Language
Gulŋay was one of the Dyirbalic languages, and a dialect of Dyirbal.

Country
Their southern border lay on the range above Kirrama.

Alternative names
 Kurungai
 Kulngai
 Gulngay
 Tjulngai
 Djulngai
 Mallanpara
 Malanbara
 Tully blacks

Notes

Citations

Sources

Aboriginal peoples of Queensland